Gérard Mulumba Kalemba (8 July 1937 – 15 April 2020) was a Congolese prelate of the Catholic Church.

Born in Kananga, Mulumba Kalemba was ordained to the priesthood in 1967. He was appointed bishop of Mweka in 1989, serving until his retirement in 2017. His brother, Étienne Tshisekedi, and nephew, Félix Tshisekedi, both served as President of the Democratic Republic of the Congo.

On 15 April 2020, during the DR Congo coronavirus pandemic, Mulumba Kalemba died due to COVID-19 in Kinshasa. He was 82.

References

1937 births
2020 deaths
Deaths from the COVID-19 pandemic in the Democratic Republic of the Congo
People from Kananga
20th-century Roman Catholic bishops in the Democratic Republic of the Congo
21st-century Roman Catholic bishops in the Democratic Republic of the Congo
Roman Catholic bishops of Mweka
21st-century Democratic Republic of the Congo people